Porcellio xavieri is a species of woodlouse in the genus Porcellio belonging to the family Porcellionidae that is endemic to Madeira.

References

Crustaceans described in 1959
Endemic fauna of Madeira
Woodlice of Europe
Porcellionidae